The Aero A.46 was a Czechoslovakian military trainer biplane that flew in prototype form in 1931. No mass production resulted from Aero.

Specifications (A.46)

See also

1930s Czechoslovakian military trainer aircraft
A046
Biplanes
Single-engined tractor aircraft